Coralliodrilus randyi is a species of clitellate oligochaete worm, first found in Belize, on the Caribbean side of Central America.

References

Further reading
Erséus, Christer. "Aspects of the phylogeny of the marine Tubificidae."Hydrobiologia 115.1 (1984): 37-44.

External links
WORMS

Invertebrates of Central America
Tubificina